Choo Hoey (朱暉, born 20 October 1934, Palembang, Sumatra) is a Singaporean musician and conductor. Choo founded the Singapore Symphony Orchestra and was also its first resident conductor and music director. Choo was awarded Singapore's inaugural Cultural Medallion for music in 1979.

Early life and education 
Choo was born on 20 October 1934 in Palembang, Sumatra, Indonesia to father, Choo Seng, a Chinese migrant from Chaojhou, Guangdong, China and his mother from Nanking, Jiangsu, China.

Choo's first encounter with classical music started from listening to his father's collection of records and was drawn to the violin. His father noticed his attraction and started his lessons in violin with a Teach Yourself book. After Choo Hoey's primary education in 1945, his family migrated to Singapore in 1946 and he continued his secondary education at The Chinese High School.

In 1947, Choo Hoey started his violin training under Goh Soon Tioe. Using only two years of study in Singapore, he obtained his Grade 8 with distinction from the Associated Board of the Royal Schools of Music in London, England. Upon completing his secondary education in 1951, Choo Hoey went to the Royal Academy of Music in London to study the violin under David Martin, the French horn under Aubrey Brain, and conducting under Maurice Miles.

In 1954, Choo Hoey studied conducting under Igor Markevitch and the violin under André Gertler. In 1955, he graduated from the Royal Academy of Music, awarded with the Mann's Memorial Prize and the Earnest Read Prize for conducting. In 1957, he continued his violin training at the Royal Conservatory of Brussels in Belgium where he would later start his career in the Belgian National Orchestra.

Career
In 1958, Choo Hoey began his career in the Belgian National Orchestra where his debut performances with Stravinsky's The Soldier's Tale met critical acclaim and prompted a series of guest performances and a later career as visiting conductor across Europe and South America. Choo Hoey had guest performed with over sixty orchestras throughout the world including the London Symphony Orchestra, the London Philharmonic Orchestra, the Orchestre de la Société des Concerts du Conservatoire, Tonhalle Orchester Zürich, Oslo Philharmonic and the Orchestre de la Suisse Romande. From 1968 till 1977, he was named principal conductor of the Greek National Opera and became a frequent guest conductor in the four major symphony orchestras of Greece holding numerous world premieres of contemporary Greek works, many of which were recorded with the Hellenic Radio and Television Symphony Orchestra.

In 1978, Choo Hoey was invited by the Singapore government to set up the Singapore Symphony Orchestra and become its first Music Director and Conductor from 1979 to 1996. Choo Hoey also proposed the creation of the Singapore Symphony Chorus and along with the Singapore Symphony Orchestra, led them to their 1980 international debut in Scandinavia. Upon his retirement as Music Director and Conductor in the Singapore Symphony Orchestra, Choo Hoey was appointed Conductor Emeritus in honour of his contributions and service.

Honors 
For his contribution to music in Singapore, Choo Hoey was awarded the Republic's inaugural Cultural Medallion (1979). He was also conferred the Public Service Star in 1982, and was made an Honorary Doctor of Letters of the National University of Singapore in 1989. In 1997, Choo Hoey was knighted with the status of Chevalier des Arts et des Lettres by the Government of France.

Personal life
Choo Hoey is married to Alexandra, a Greek archaeologist, and had two sons. He resides in Athens and London, where his sons live.

References

1934 births
Indonesian people of Chinese descent
Living people
Royal Conservatory of Brussels alumni
Singaporean conductors (music)
Singaporean classical musicians
Singaporean people of Teochew descent
People from Palembang
Recipients of the Cultural Medallion
Indonesian emigrants to Singapore
20th-century Singaporean musicians
21st-century Singaporean musicians
20th-century conductors (music)
21st-century conductors (music)